This article contains all squads that played in the 2015–16 Euroleague basketball tournament.

Group A

Real Madrid

Fenerbahçe

Khimki

Crvena Zvezda

Bayern Munich

Strasbourg

Group B

Olympiacos

Anadolu Efes

Laboral Kutxa

EA7 Milano

Cedevita

Limoges

Group C

FC Barcelona Lassa

Panathinaikos

Lokomotiv Kuban

Žalgiris

Pınar Karşıyaka

Stelmet Zielona Góra

Group D

CSKA Moscow

Maccabi Tel Aviv

Unicaja

Brose Baskets

Darüşşafaka Doğuş

Dinamo Sassari

squads
Basketball squads